Frederick Hartman (born 29 January 1952) is a Guyanese cricketer. He played in four first-class and two List A matches for Guyana from 1975 to 1978.

See also
 List of Guyanese representative cricketers

References

External links
 

1952 births
Living people
Guyanese cricketers
Guyana cricketers
Sportspeople from Georgetown, Guyana